Andromeda Heights is the sixth studio album by the English pop group Prefab Sprout. It was released by Kitchenware Records on 2 May 1997. It peaked at number 7 in the UK Albums Chart. "A Prisoner of the Past" and "Electric Guitars" were also released as singles, peaking at number 30 and number 53, respectively, in the UK Singles Chart.

The high-tech recording studio that Paddy McAloon built for himself at his home in County Durham is also called Andromeda heights.

Critical reception
Stephen Thomas Erlewine of AllMusic stated that "the album doesn't quite fulfill the hopes of the group's fervent followers." He added, "Andromeda Heights is a solid Prefab Sprout record, filled with elegant melodies, wry lyrics and immaculate production, but after seven years, that nevertheless ranks as a disappointment."

Track listing

Personnel
Credits adapted from liner notes.

Musicians
 Wendy Smith – vocals
 Paddy McAloon – vocals, piano, keyboards, programming, mandolin; guitar (on "A Prisoner of the Past")
 David Brewis – guitar, mandolin
 Martin McAloon – bass guitar
 Paul Smith – percussion
 Tommy Smith – tenor saxophone, soprano saxophone, flute
 Frazer Spiers – harmonica
 Jim Hornsby – mandolin; guitar (on "A Prisoner of the Past")
 Martin Taylor – guitar (on "Anne Marie" and "Andromeda Heights")
 Calum Malcolm – piano, keyboards, programming; organ (on "The Fifth Horseman")
 Alan Clark – organ (on "The Mystery of Love")

Technical personnel
 Paddy McAloon – production
 Calum Malcolm – recording, mixing
 Stylorouge – sleeve design
 Stuart Douglas – sleeve photography
 Anne Magill – cover painting

Charts

References

External links
 
 

1997 albums
Prefab Sprout albums
Kitchenware Records albums